was a Japanese international school in Jimboomba, Logan City, Queensland. It was an overseas branch of a Japanese private school, or a Shiritsu zaigai kyōiku shisetsu (私立在外教育施設). It was a part of the Hills Educational Foundation, and was associated with the South Queensland International College (SQIC) and Hills Language College (HLC). It was affiliated with Seirinkan High School, and it served the high school level.

The school opened in 1992 (Heisei Year 4). The Japanese Ministry of Education (Monbusho or, today, MEXT) certified the school on 18 December that year. It was decertified by MEXT on 31 March 2013 (Heisei 25). The school closed in 2006 (Heisei 18).

See also
Part-time Japanese schools in Australia
 Canberra Japanese Supplementary School
 Melbourne International School of Japanese
 Japanese Language Supplementary School of Queensland

References

External links

 
  (early 2000s old website).

Asian-Australian culture in Queensland
1992 establishments in Australia
Educational institutions established in 1992
2006 disestablishments in Australia
Educational institutions disestablished in 2006
Defunct schools in Queensland
Japanese international schools in Australia
Defunct shiritsu zaigai kyōiku shisetsu